Joella Lloyd (born 12 April 2002) is an athlete from Antigua and Barbuda, who holds the national record in both the 100 metres and 200 metres sprint events.

From St. John's, Antigua and Barbuda where she attended Antigua Girls’ High School before going to study at the University of Tennessee.

Lloyd produced a personal best of 23.39 in the 200 metres at the SEC Championships, placing 9th overall in February 2021. On 27 February 2021, Lloyd won the indoor 60 metres conference title at the SEC Championships, tying the all-time program record with a time of 7.15 seconds and recording the No. 1 mark in the world by any female athlete under 20 years old.

Lloyd finished sixth at her NCAA indoor nationals debut on 13 March 2021, posting a time of 7.23 in the 60 metres.

Lloyd set a new Antigua and Barbuda national record in the 100 meters in May 2021, running 11.19 for first place at the Tennessee Challenge in Knoxville. It was also the World U-20 leading time for 2021, beating the USA's Tionna Brown and her 11.29 run. She won the 100 m bronze and 200 m silver medal in the 2021 NACAC U20 Championships.

Selected for the 100 metres in the delayed 2020 Summer Olympics Lloyd won her preliminary heat in 11.55 seconds, before running 11.54 in the first round finishing 7th in the heat.

In May 2022, Lloyd added the national  200 metres record to her 100m record when she ran 23.09 at the SEC championships. Lloyd lowered this again at the NCAA championship semi-finals running 22.66 for the 200 metres. At the 2022 World Athletics Championships Lloyd qualified from the heats to the semi-finals, again running below 23 seconds.

References

External links
 

Living people
2002 births
Antigua and Barbuda female sprinters
Tennessee Volunteers women's track and field athletes
People from St. John's, Antigua and Barbuda
Athletes (track and field) at the 2020 Summer Olympics
Olympic female sprinters
Olympic athletes of Antigua and Barbuda
Athletes (track and field) at the 2022 Commonwealth Games